The International Register of Certificated Auditors (IRCA) was formed in London in 1984 as part of the British government's enterprise initiative, designed to make industry and business more competitive through the implementation of quality principles and practices. Over 30,000 auditors have been awarded professional certification since 1984 and represents more than 120 countries. Every year, over 60,000 delegates attend an IRCA-certified training course. IRCA is a division of the Chartered Quality Institute (CQI), the UK's chartered body for quality management professionals.

References

External links
 

Auditing organizations
Holborn
International organisations based in London
Organisations based in the London Borough of Camden
Professional titles and certifications
Quality management
Standards organisations in the United Kingdom